Paramanandal is a Panchayat town in Tiruvanamalai district, Tamil Nadu India. It is Chengam taluk's fourth largest town and had a population of 9920 in 2011.Estimated to have a population of 11000 in 2022. It is in the windward side of Eastern Ghats situated at an altitude of 372m.The Villlage is on the foothills of Javadu hills, which is parts of Eastern ghats .Kuppanatham dam is 9 kilometers from Paramanandal.

Cities and towns in Tiruvannamalai district